Simon Bolivar, also called Almahdi, is an affluent neighborhood in north western Tehran located on the hills of Alborz Mountains. Due to the latest census held in Tehran, the hood is home to 53000 people in a 1.36 square kilometers wide area. It's named after Simón Bolívar, the Venezuelan military and political leader.

Location

The neighborhood borders limit from north to Simon Bolivar Boulevard (named after Simón Bolívar), from east to  Ashrafi Esfahani Expressway, from south to   Hashemi Rafsanjani Expressway and from west to  Sattari Expressway.  Within the administrative divisions of Tehran, Simon Bolivar has common borders along with six neighborhoods including: Morad Abad, Kouhsar and Naft (in the north), Punak (in the east), North Punak (in the south) and finally North Jannat Abad (in the west). Since Simon Bolivar is located on a relief ground in comparison to most of Tehran, it benefits from healthy non polluted air according to Tehran Air Quality Control Company. Using Hashemi Rafsanjani Expressway, Simon Bolivar connects to Sa'adat Abad (to east) and Jannat Abad (to west). Excluding western and southwestern parts, it’s almost a residential neighborhood with pacific atmosphere and snug vegetated alleys while main streets are quite wide. Streets and alleys follow a tidy rectangular pattern which makes it easy to reach anyplace.

Transportations
Main streets in Simon Bolivar are listed below:
Imam Reza St.
Zeytoun St.
Almahdi St.
Chamran St.
Fakouri St.
BRT (Tehran rapid bus transits):
 Taleqani station (line #10)

Gallery

See also

Punak
Tehran
Sa'adat Abad
List of Expressways in Tehran

References

Neighbourhoods in Tehran